Gazalvishwa (Gujarati: ગઝલવિશ્વ) is a quarterly Gujarati ghazal poetry journal, published by Vali Gujarati Gazal Kendra from Gandhinagar, Gujarat, India since 2006. The journal publishes ghazals, ghazal reviews, critical works and interviews of ghazal poets.

History 
In 2006, The Vali Gujarati Ghazal Kendra was founded for the promotion of Gujarati Ghazal as a literary form of expression and a magazine was also started under its aegis. Rajesh Vyas was a founding editor.

In 2017, it was merged into Shabdasrishti.

See also 
 Dhabak, quarterly Gujarati language ghazal poetry journal
 Shabdasrishti, Gujarati literary magazine
 Kavilok, Gujarati language bimonthly poetry journal

References

External links
 

2006 establishments in Gujarat
Gujarati-language magazines
Gujarati literature
Literary magazines published in India
Quarterly magazines published in India
Magazines established in 2006
Poetry literary magazines